Konstantinos Papageorgiou (born 13 July 1995) is a Greek professional footballer who plays as a midfielder for Super League 2 club AEL.

References

1995 births
Living people
Greek footballers
Football League (Greece) players
Gamma Ethniki players
Super League Greece 2 players
Veria F.C. players
Edessaikos F.C. players
Trikala F.C. players
Athlitiki Enosi Larissa F.C. players
Association football midfielders
Footballers from Edessa, Greece